Petlin is a surname. Notable people with the surname include:

Irving Petlin (1934–2018), American artist and painter 
Ivan Petlin, 17th-century Siberian Cossack